Wow! or known as Exclamation Point is the eleventh studio album by Taiwanese singer Jay Chou, released on 11 November 2011 by JVR Music.

The album was nominated for three Golden Melody Awards and won for Best Album Packaging.

Track listing

Awards

References

External links
  Jay Chou discography@JVR Music

2011 albums
Jay Chou albums
Sony Music Taiwan albums